Vice-Admiral John Lyons (1 September 1787December 1872) was an eminent British Admiral and Foreign Ambassador of the Royal Navy.

Family

Lyons was born on 1 September 1787 and was baptized at Lyndhurst in Hampshire in autumn-winter 1788. His mother was Catherine Walrond, who was the daughter of the 5th Marquis de Vallado and Sarah Lyons (1731–1764). His paternal grandfather was John Lyons (1731–1775), who had succeeded to the 563 acre Lyons Estate in Antigua in 1748 and served as a member of the Council of Antigua from 1764 to 1775. His great-grandfather and 2nd-great-grandfather had also been members of the council.

His brothers included Admiral Edmund Lyons, 1st Baron Lyons (1790–1858); Lieutenant Maine Walrond Lyons (1798–1827), a lieutenant in the navy who was killed at Battle of Navarino; and Humphrey Lyons (1802–1873), a lieutenant-general in the Indian (Bombay) Army. His nephews included the diplomat Richard Lyons, 1st Viscount Lyons (1817–1887); Sir Algernon McLennan Lyons, Admiral of the Fleet (1833–1908); and Richard Lyons Pearson, Assistant Commissioner of the Metropolitan Police (1831–1890).

Career
The other captains of the ship included Sampson Edwards, Henry Nichols, and William Grenville Lobb. The ship also bore the flag of Admiral Lord Nelson and Admiral Charles Morice Pole. The ship was involved in the blockade of Toulon, and, with Captain Thomas Hardy on board, at the Battle of Copenhagen. 

In April 1801, Lyons served under the flag of Admiral Sir Hyde Parker, and during the Peace of Amiens during 1801–1803, on the West India Station and the Home Station, in the 74-gun  and the 14-carriage-gun brig-sloop . Lyons also served with Captain Delafons on the 38-gun , which had been captured from the French in 1801, and with Captain Thomas Manby. In 1803, Lyons joined the 74-gun , which struck rocks off Brest on 25 March 1804 whilst blockading the French. Lyons then joined the 100-gun , which had been a French ship of the line captured at the Battle of the Nile, for three months until he joined , then Nelson's flagship, on which he was present at the Battle of Trafalgar on 21 October 1805. Lyons then moved to Admiral Lord Collingwood's 98-gun  for the blockade of Cadiz, and then to the 74-gun  of Captain Charles Rowley, on which he was present for the taking of the island of Capri from Napoleon in May 1806. In 1807 Lyons was transferred to the 74-gun , on which he was involved in the evacuation of the Messina Straits in the winter of 1807. He was involved in the assault on the Castle of Santa Maura on the Greek island of Lefkada in the Ionian Sea. 

He married Caroline Bowen (b.1789), who was the daughter of Major Bowen R. A., in 1810 at St. Paul's Anglican Cathedral in Malta. Lyons subsequently joined the 110-gun  in January 1814, and was promoted to commander on 27 June 1815, as which he served at the Cape of Good Hope between 1828 and 1830 onboard , a  18-gun brig-sloop involved with anti-slave operations between Mauritius and Madagascar. He was promoted to captain in 1830.

Between 1839 and 1840 Lyons was employed as an ambassador to the Ottoman states by the Egyptian Government between Cairo and Alexandria and Syria. He introduced to the Ottoman pasha and the Egyptian landmarks dignitaries who travelled between Bombay, Suez, and Britain. The overland journey to India by this passage took two months. In 1851 Lyons had retired to Hampshire in England. In 1861 he was living in Surrey. He was promoted to vice-admiral in 1866. His first wife died in August 1864, and he married in 1865, at Hove, Sussex, Anna Maria Ferguson, a widow of Colonel John L. Mowatt of the Bengal Horse Artillery, with whom he was living at Worthing in 1871. He died in December 1872 when aged 85.

References

Sources and further reading
 
 

1787 births
1872 deaths
Royal Navy officers